Urania is a muse in Greek mythology.

Urania may also refer to:

Mythology
Aphrodite Urania, a title for the Greek goddess Aphrodite, as opposed to Aphrodite Pandemos
Urania, an Oceanid

People
Julia Urania, wife of Roman client King Ptolemy of Mauretania
Urania Papatheu (born 1965), Italian politician

Places
Urânia, a city in the state of São Paulo, Brazil
Urania, Louisiana, a town in the United States
Urania, Michigan, a former community
Urania, South Australia, a locality in the Yorke Peninsula Council

Publications

Magazines and journals
Urania, a German science magazine published by Gesellschaft zur Verbreitung wissenschaftlicher Kenntnisse
Urania (journal), a genderqueer feminist journal circulated between 1916 and 1940
Urania (magazine), a number of science fiction magazines
Urania - Postępy Astronomii, a Polish popular science magazine

Literature
The Countesse of Mountgomeries Urania, a work by Lady Mary Wroth
Urania (original title Uranie), 1889 work by Camille Flammarion
Urania, a poem by Samuel Austin

Science

Buildings
Urania (Berlin), the first science center in the world, founded in Berlin in 1888
Urania (Vienna), an observatory
Urania Sternwarte, an observatory in Zurich

Other
30 Urania, an asteroid
Unified Reduced Non-Inductive Assessment (URANIA), an upgrade to Pegasus Toroidal Experiment
Urania (moth), a moth genus in subfamily Uraniinae
Uranium dioxide, or urania, or uranic oxide
Yellowcake, also called urania, concentrated uranium ore

Other uses
, several ships of that name
Urania Genève Sport, a Swiss football club
Urania Records, an American classical and jazz record label founded in 1951
Uranian (sexology), a 19th-century term that referred to a person of a third sex

See also
Ourania (disambiguation)

Uranus (disambiguation)